Perth Roller Derby (PRD) is a women's flat track roller derby league based in Perth, Western Australia. Founded in 2008, the league is a member of the Women's Flat Track Derby Association (WFTDA).

History
The league was formed in June 2008, and began bouting in mid-2009.  By the end of 2010, it was selling out its 700-seat venue.
Perth Roller Derby competed in the 2010 Great Southern Slam, where they reached the quarter-final before losing 207–51 to the Pirate City Rollers from Auckland.  The league again entered the 2012 tournament, but narrowly lost both opening round bouts, to Gold Coast and the Canberra Roller Derby League.

In September 2013, Perth Roller Derby's representative teams both competed in the first statewide roller derby tournament, the Boom State Clash. The West Coast Evils played through the tournament undefeated, making it through to the grand final where they played fellow Perth league, WA Roller Derby. The West Coast Evils took out the win 305 - 98. The Rumble Bees fought hard and won one of their three games, taking out fifth place.
In October 2013, Perth Roller Derby was accepted as a member of the Women's Flat Track Derby Association Apprentice Programme. In December 2014, Perth became a full member in the WFTDA.

, Perth includes three home teams, The Galactic Storms (who wear green and black), The Solar Flares (red and white) and The Super Novas (purple and yellow) and two travel teams, the West Coast Evils and Rumble Bees (who both wear black or white with blue accents).

WFTDA competition
Perth's travel team the West Coast Evils represents the league in WFDTA-sanctioned play. In 2018, the West Coast Evils participated at their first international tournament, taking first place at the 2018 Mayday Mayhem tournament in Loveland, Colorado. Also in 2018, the league declined invitation to the WFTDA North America West Continental Cup in Omaha, Nebraska, citing the cost of air travel to the city.

Rankings

DNP = qualified but did not play

References

Roller derby leagues in Australia
Roller derby leagues established in 2008
Sport in Perth, Western Australia
2008 establishments in Australia